Pomarose is a high-impact captive odorant patented by Givaudan. It is a double-unsaturated ketone that does not occur in nature. Pomarose has a powerful fruity rose odor with nuances of apples, plums and raisins, which is almost entirely due to the (2E,5Z)-stereoisomer, while its (2E,5E)-isomer is barely detectable for most people. Catalyzed by traces of acids, both isomers equilibrate however quickly upon standing in glass containers.

Discovery and synthesis
5,6,7-Trimethylocta-2,5-dien-4-one was suspected by Philip Kraft et al. by investigation of the NMR spectra of an unknown trace component with damascone odor in a crude complex reaction product. Although this trace component eventually turned out to be the constitutional isomer 2-methyl-3-isopropylhepta-2,5-dien-4-one.  Pomarose was synthesized for structural curiosity and found to possess even superior fruity, rosy odor characteristics, reminiscent of apples, plums, raisins and other dried fruits with a low odor threshold of 0.5 ng/L air. The synthesis comprised borontrifluoride-catalyzed addition of methyl isopropyl ketone to 1-ethoxyprop-1-yne, which afforded ethyl 2,3,4-trimethylpent-2-enoate, and then was transformed into the target molecule by Grignard reaction with propen-1-ylmagnesium bromide via in situ enolization.

Use in perfumery
Pomarose has been used in a variety of perfumes.  It had its debut in Be Delicious for Men and it is also used in Unforgivable, 1 Million, CK free, Legend, Unforgivable Woman and John Galliano.

Related compounds
 Damascones

References

Perfume ingredients
Ketones
Alkene derivatives